Artashes Baghdasaryan (born 11 February 1984, in Yerevan, Armenia) is an Armenian football defender, currently with Armenian Premier League club Impuls FC Dilijan. He is also a member of the Armenia national football team, and has 1 cap since his debut in 2006. Playing for Austria Kärnten, he was injured and soon moved to Armenia. He currently plays for Ulisses.

External links 
 
 Profile at FFA

Armenian footballers
Armenia international footballers
Armenian expatriate footballers
Expatriate footballers in Austria
SK Austria Kärnten players
Ulisses FC players
Austrian Football Bundesliga players
Footballers from Yerevan
1984 births
Living people
Armenian Premier League players
Association football defenders